Luke Martin Gell is an English actor. He was educated at The Kings School in Nottingham and trained at Central Independent Television's Television Workshop. He has been described as a "young Peter Kay" and is most well known for the role of Tim in the BBC Three sitcom, Two Pints of Lager and a Packet of Crisps from 2008 to the show's end in 2011.

Career
Gell has been acting since the age of 11, including in the long-running hospital drama Casualty, and now runs the weekend drama workshop "Inspire Academy" for young actors.

From April - June 2008, Gell appeared in the BBC Three comedy Scallywagga.

He appeared in a one off episode of Above Their Station on 22 February 2010.

Off-screen career
Gell is the owner of a Nottingham based theatre company named Inspire Academy.

References

External links

Year of birth missing (living people)
Living people
21st-century English male actors
English male television actors
People from Nottingham